Margret Fusbahn (née Billwiller, 1907 - 2001), was a German aviator. She flew in airshows, undertook long-haul flights from Europe to Africa and in 1930, she broke the international altitude record for light-aircraft when she reached 15,900 feet.

Fusbahn's husband, Ludwig Werner Fusbahn, was also an aviator. The pair were nicknamed "the flying couple".

The town of Sindelfingen has a street named after Fusbahn, Margret Fusbahn Straße.

References

1907 births
2001 deaths
German women aviators
German aviation record holders
German women aviation record holders